Azucena Mora, the screen name of Livia Lidia Mora Mendoza (born 21 October 1945), is an Ecuadorian theater and television actress who achieved notoriety with her performance as Petita Pacheco in the TV series  produced by Ecuavisa. She has been a public servant for the Ecuadorian Ministry of Culture.

Biography
Azucena Mora was born Livia Lidia Mora Mendoza in Milagro, Ecuador, but her mother and relatives called her Azucena. She established herself at school, where she sang and performed, but at age 12 moved away to Guayaquil. Azucena studied for three years at the Theater School of the House of Culture in Guayaquil. At 32, she joined the theater group El Juglar.

Azucena also played in the Ecuavisia productions Yo vendo unos ojos negros, El hombre de la casa, and in 2016 appeared on the Ecuadorian telenovela 3 familias, again playing with Mimo Cava and Prisca Bustamente.

Azucena was married for 15 years.

Citations

Living people
1945 births
People from Milagro, Ecuador
Ecuadorian television actresses
21st-century Ecuadorian women